Cha-232 or No. 232 (Japanese: 第二百三十二號驅潜特務艇) was a No.1-class auxiliary submarine chaser of the Imperial Japanese Navy that served during World War II.

History
She was laid down on 26 August 1944 at the Ujiyamada shipyard of Nishii Shipyards (西井=西井造船所) and launched in 1944. She was fitted with armaments at the Yokosuka Naval Arsenal, completed and commissioned on 31 December 1944, and assigned to the Sasebo Guard Force. On 15 May 1945, she was assigned to the Shimonoseki Defense Team. Cha-232 survived the war.

On 30 December 1945, she was demobilized and enrolled as a minesweeper by the occupation forces operating out of Shimonoseki. On 28 August 1947, she was assigned to the Japan Maritime Safety Agency and on 20 August 1948 she was designated as a patrol boat (PB-09) and renamed  Ōtaka. On 1 July 1950, she was re-designated as  PS-09 and on 1 August 1951 as minesweeper MS-86. On 1 July 1954, she was transferred to the newly created Japan Maritime Self-Defense Force. On 1 April 1956, she was re-designated Special Boat No. 10 (MS-86). She was delisted on 31 March 1957.

References

1944 ships
No.1-class auxiliary submarine chasers
Auxiliary ships of the Imperial Japanese Navy